Sahlabad (also Romanized as Sahlābād and Sehlābād) is a village in Shusef Rural District, Shusef District, Nehbandan County, South Khorasan Province, Iran. At the 2006 census, its population was 305, in 85 families.

References 

Populated places in Nehbandan County